The 1923 Pittsburgh Pirates season was the 42nd season of the Pittsburgh Pirates franchise; the 37th in the National League. The Pirates finished third in the league standings with a record of 87–67.

Regular season

Season standings

Record vs. opponents

Game log

|- bgcolor="ccffcc"
| 1 || April 17 || @ Cubs || 3–2 || Morrison (1–0) || Osborne || — || 33,000 || 1–0
|- bgcolor="ffbbbb"
| 2 || April 18 || @ Cubs || 2–7 || Alexander || Boehler (0–1) || — || — || 1–1
|- bgcolor="ffbbbb"
| 3 || April 19 || @ Cubs || 5–10 || Aldridge || Adams (0–1) || — || — || 1–2
|- bgcolor="ffbbbb"
| 4 || April 20 || @ Cubs || 11–12 || Osborne || Adams (0–2) || — || — || 1–3
|- bgcolor="ffbbbb"
| 5 || April 21 || @ Reds || 6–12 || Donohue || Cooper (0–1) || — || — || 1–4
|- bgcolor="ccffcc"
| 6 || April 22 || @ Reds || 15–9 || Morrison (2–0) || Rixey || Bagby (1) || — || 2–4
|- bgcolor="ccffcc"
| 7 || April 23 || @ Reds || 8–4 || Boehler (1–1) || Couch || Glazner (1) || — || 3–4
|- bgcolor="ffbbbb"
| 8 || April 24 || @ Reds || 4–5 || Luque || Kunz (0–1) || — || — || 3–5
|- bgcolor="ccffcc"
| 9 || April 25 || Cubs || 7–3 || Cooper (1–1) || Fussell || — || 30,000 || 4–5
|- bgcolor="ccffcc"
| 10 || April 26 || Cubs || 7–2 || Adams (1–2) || Osborne || — || — || 5–5
|- bgcolor="ccffcc"
| 11 || April 27 || Cubs || 2–1 || Morrison (3–0) || Alexander || — || — || 6–5
|- bgcolor="ffbbbb"
| 12 || April 29 || @ Cardinals || 2–3 || Haines || Glazner (0–1) || — || — || 6–6
|- bgcolor="ffbbbb"
| 13 || April 30 || @ Cardinals || 5–7 || Doak || Boehler (1–2) || Sherdel || 5,000 || 6–7
|-

|- bgcolor="ccffcc"
| 14 || May 1 || @ Cardinals || 6–2 || Cooper (2–1) || Sherdel || — || 3,500 || 7–7
|- bgcolor="ffbbbb"
| 15 || May 2 || @ Cardinals || 1–12 || Pfeffer || Morrison (3–1) || — || 2,000 || 7–8
|- bgcolor="ccffcc"
| 16 || May 3 || Reds || 3–1 || Adams (2–2) || Donohue || — || 3,000 || 8–8
|- bgcolor="ccffcc"
| 17 || May 4 || Reds || 11–6 || Glazner (1–1) || Rixey || Bagby (2) || — || 9–8
|- bgcolor="ccffcc"
| 18 || May 5 || Reds || 10–7 || Cooper (3–1) || Keck || Morrison (1) || — || 10–8
|- bgcolor="ffbbbb"
| 19 || May 6 || @ Reds || 7–8 || Donohue || Hamilton (0–1) || — || — || 10–9
|- bgcolor="ccffcc"
| 20 || May 7 || Cardinals || 11–4 || Adams (3–2) || Sherdel || — || 8,000 || 11–9
|- bgcolor="ccffcc"
| 21 || May 8 || @ Robins || 8–6 || Morrison (4–1) || Harper || — || 3,500 || 12–9
|- bgcolor="ffbbbb"
| 22 || May 11 || @ Robins || 6–7 || Grimes || Bagby (0–1) || — || 2,000 || 12–10
|- bgcolor="ffbbbb"
| 23 || May 13 || @ Giants || 0–9 || McQuillan || Cooper (3–2) || — || 35,000 || 12–11
|- bgcolor="ccffcc"
| 24 || May 14 || @ Giants || 4–1 || Adams (4–2) || Nehf || — || 8,000 || 13–11
|- bgcolor="ffbbbb"
| 25 || May 16 || @ Giants || 2–6 || Scott || Morrison (4–2) || — || 5,000 || 13–12
|- bgcolor="ffbbbb"
| 26 || May 17 || @ Braves || 0–1 (10) || Rudolph || Cooper (3–3) || — || — || 13–13
|- bgcolor="ccffcc"
| 27 || May 18 || @ Braves || 4–3 || Adams (5–2) || Fillingim || Kunz (1) || — || 14–13
|- bgcolor="ccffcc"
| 28 || May 19 || @ Braves || 5–0 || Glazner (2–1) || McNamara || — || — || 15–13
|- bgcolor="ccffcc"
| 29 || May 21 || @ Phillies || 5–3 || Morrison (5–2) || Behan || — || — || 16–13
|- bgcolor="ccffcc"
| 30 || May 22 || @ Phillies || 13–6 || Cooper (4–3) || Meadows || — || — || 17–13
|- bgcolor="ccffcc"
| 31 || May 23 || @ Phillies || 7–6 || Kunz (1–1) || Head || — || — || 18–13
|- bgcolor="ccffcc"
| 32 || May 24 || Cardinals || 11–4 || Adams (6–2) || Sherdel || — || 10,000 || 19–13
|- bgcolor="ccffcc"
| 33 || May 25 || Cardinals || 2–1 || Morrison (6–2) || Doak || — || 6,000 || 20–13
|- bgcolor="ffbbbb"
| 34 || May 26 || Cardinals || 4–5 || Haines || Cooper (4–4) || — || 15,000 || 20–14
|- bgcolor="ccffcc"
| 35 || May 27 || @ Cubs || 4–2 || Meadows (1–0) || Aldridge || — || — || 21–14
|- bgcolor="ffbbbb"
| 36 || May 28 || @ Cubs || 4–5 (11) || Fussell || Kunz (1–2) || — || — || 21–15
|- bgcolor="ccffcc"
| 37 || May 29 || Cubs || 7–6 || Bagby (1–1) || Stueland || — || — || 22–15
|- bgcolor="ccffcc"
| 38 || May 30 || Cubs || 5–4 || Morrison (7–2) || Kaufmann || — || 20,000 || 23–15
|- bgcolor="ccffcc"
| 39 || May 30 || Cubs || 10–2 || Cooper (5–4) || Aldridge || — || 30,000 || 24–15
|- bgcolor="ffbbbb"
| 40 || May 31 || @ Cardinals || 1–4 || Toney || Meadows (1–1) || — || 1,000 || 24–16
|-

|- bgcolor="ffbbbb"
| 41 || June 1 || @ Cardinals || 3–4 (11) || Pfeffer || Hamilton (0–2) || — || — || 24–17
|- bgcolor="ffbbbb"
| 42 || June 3 || @ Cardinals || 3–4 || Haines || Cooper (5–5) || — || — || 24–18
|- bgcolor="ffbbbb"
| 43 || June 4 || Robins || 3–5 || Grimes || Morrison (7–3) || — || 7,000 || 24–19
|- bgcolor="ccffcc"
| 44 || June 5 || Robins || 5–2 || Meadows (2–1) || Dickerman || — || 5,000 || 25–19
|- bgcolor="ccffcc"
| 45 || June 6 || Robins || 7–3 || Hamilton (1–2) || Ruether || — || 4,000 || 26–19
|- bgcolor="ccffcc"
| 46 || June 8 || Giants || 9–6 || Morrison (8–3) || McQuillan || — || 15,000 || 27–19
|- bgcolor="ffbbbb"
| 47 || June 9 || Giants || 0–6 || Bentley || Meadows (2–2) || — || 30,000 || 27–20
|- bgcolor="ccffcc"
| 48 || June 12 || Giants || 4–2 || Cooper (6–5) || Nehf || — || 15,000 || 28–20
|- bgcolor="ccffcc"
| 49 || June 13 || Phillies || 4–2 || Morrison (9–3) || Behan || — || — || 29–20
|- bgcolor="ffbbbb"
| 50 || June 14 || Phillies || 1–2 || Ring || Meadows (2–3) || — || — || 29–21
|- bgcolor="ccffcc"
| 51 || June 16 || Phillies || 4–1 || Cooper (7–5) || Weinert || — || — || 30–21
|- bgcolor="ccffcc"
| 52 || June 18 || Braves || 8–3 || Morrison (10–3) || Marquard || — || — || 31–21
|- bgcolor="ffbbbb"
| 53 || June 20 || Braves || 8–14 (10) || Benton || Boehler (1–3) || Barnes || — || 31–22
|- bgcolor="ccffcc"
| 54 || June 21 || Braves || 2–1 || Adams (7–2) || Barnes || — || 3,000 || 32–22
|- bgcolor="ccffcc"
| 55 || June 22 || Reds || 8–2 || Meadows (3–3) || Donohue || — || — || 33–22
|- bgcolor="ffbbbb"
| 56 || June 23 || Reds || 4–5 || Rixey || Cooper (7–6) || Benton || 10,000 || 33–23
|- bgcolor="ccffcc"
| 57 || June 24 || @ Cardinals || 6–4 || Morrison (11–3) || Pfeffer || Bagby (3) || — || 34–23
|- bgcolor="ccffcc"
| 58 || June 25 || @ Cardinals || 3–1 || Hamilton (2–2) || Haines || — || 5,000 || 35–23
|- bgcolor="ccffcc"
| 59 || June 26 || @ Cardinals || 7–5 || Meadows (4–3) || Doak || Adams (1) || 2,000 || 36–23
|- bgcolor="ccffcc"
| 60 || June 27 || @ Cardinals || 6–0 || Cooper (8–6) || Sherdel || — || 2,000 || 37–23
|- bgcolor="ffbbbb"
| 61 || June 29 || Reds || 0–2 || Luque || Morrison (11–4) || — || — || 37–24
|- bgcolor="ccffcc"
| 62 || June 29 || Reds || 5–3 || Bagby (2–1) || Benton || — || — || 38–24
|- bgcolor="ccffcc"
| 63 || June 30 || Reds || 4–3 || Adams (8–2) || Rixey || — || 22,000 || 39–24
|-

|- bgcolor="ffbbbb"
| 64 || July 1 || @ Reds || 2–3 || Donohue || Cooper (8–7) || Luque || — || 39–25
|- bgcolor="ccffcc"
| 65 || July 2 || Cardinals || 4–1 || Hamilton (3–2) || Pfeffer || — || — || 40–25
|- bgcolor="ccffcc"
| 66 || July 3 || Cardinals || 4–2 || Meadows (5–3) || Toney || — || 8,000 || 41–25
|- bgcolor="ccffcc"
| 67 || July 4 || Cardinals || 7–5 || Cooper (9–7) || Pfeffer || — || — || 42–25
|- bgcolor="ccffcc"
| 68 || July 4 || Cardinals || 6–1 || Morrison (12–4) || Haines || — || — || 43–25
|- bgcolor="ffbbbb"
| 69 || July 6 || @ Phillies || 2–5 || Mitchell || Cooper (9–8) || — || 1,000 || 43–26
|- bgcolor="ccffcc"
| 70 || July 7 || @ Phillies || 18–5 || Meadows (6–3) || Glazner || — || — || 44–26
|- bgcolor="ffbbbb"
| 71 || July 9 || @ Phillies || 2–4 || Behan || Morrison (12–5) || — || — || 44–27
|- bgcolor="ffbbbb"
| 72 || July 10 || @ Giants || 8–9 (10) || Blume || Bagby (2–2) || — || 10,000 || 44–28
|- bgcolor="ffbbbb"
| 73 || July 11 || @ Giants || 1–6 || Watson || Hamilton (3–3) || — || — || 44–29
|- bgcolor="ccffcc"
| 74 || July 12 || @ Giants || 5–3 || Meadows (7–3) || McQuillan || — || 25,000 || 45–29
|- bgcolor="ffbbbb"
| 75 || July 12 || @ Giants || 2–4 || Scott || Adams (8–3) || — || 40,000 || 45–30
|- bgcolor="ccffcc"
| 76 || July 13 || @ Giants || 10–1 || Morrison (13–5) || Bentley || — || 7,500 || 46–30
|- bgcolor="ffbbbb"
| 77 || July 14 || @ Robins || 1–2 || Vance || Cooper (9–9) || — || 20,000 || 46–31
|- bgcolor="ccffcc"
| 78 || July 14 || @ Robins || 5–3 || Bagby (3–2) || Henry || — || 23,000 || 47–31
|- bgcolor="ccffcc"
| 79 || July 15 || @ Robins || 3–2 || Hamilton (4–3) || Ruether || — || 15,000 || 48–31
|- bgcolor="ffbbbb"
| 80 || July 16 || @ Robins || 4–8 || Grimes || Meadows (7–4) || — || — || 48–32
|- bgcolor="ffbbbb"
| 81 || July 17 || @ Robins || 2–6 || Smith || Morrison (13–6) || — || 2,500 || 48–33
|- bgcolor="ccffcc"
| 82 || July 18 || @ Braves || 5–1 || Cooper (10–9) || Marquard || — || — || 49–33
|- bgcolor="ccffcc"
| 83 || July 19 || @ Braves || 8–6 || Meadows (8–4) || Barnes || Morrison (2) || — || 50–33
|- bgcolor="ffbbbb"
| 84 || July 20 || @ Braves || 5–8 || Genewich || Hamilton (4–4) || — || — || 50–34
|- bgcolor="ccffcc"
| 85 || July 21 || @ Braves || 14–4 || Morrison (14–6) || McNamara || — || — || 51–34
|- bgcolor="ccffcc"
| 86 || July 21 || @ Braves || 6–4 || Cooper (11–9) || Miller || — || — || 52–34
|- bgcolor="ffbbbb"
| 87 || July 23 || Cubs || 3–12 (12) || Alexander || Meadows (8–5) || — || — || 52–35
|- bgcolor="ccffcc"
| 88 || July 25 || Braves || 5–2 || Adams (9–3) || Benton || — || — || 53–35
|- bgcolor="ccffcc"
| 89 || July 25 || Braves || 10–3 || Morrison (15–6) || Fillingim || — || — || 54–35
|- bgcolor="ccffcc"
| 90 || July 26 || Braves || 8–7 (12) || Hamilton (5–4) || Barnes || — || — || 55–35
|- bgcolor="ccffcc"
| 91 || July 27 || Braves || 8–5 || Meadows (9–5) || Oeschger || — || — || 56–35
|- bgcolor="ccffcc"
| 92 || July 28 || Braves || 3–1 || Cooper (12–9) || Genewich || — || — || 57–35
|- bgcolor="ccffcc"
| 93 || July 30 || Giants || 5–4 || Steineder (1–0) || Scott || — || 32,000 || 58–35
|- bgcolor="ffbbbb"
| 94 || July 30 || Giants || 2–17 || Nehf || Morrison (15–7) || Jonnard || 32,000 || 58–36
|- bgcolor="ffbbbb"
| 95 || July 31 || Giants || 4–5 || McQuillan || Hamilton (5–5) || Ryan || 10,000 || 58–37
|-

|- bgcolor="ccffcc"
| 96 || August 1 || Giants || 2–1 || Cooper (13–9) || Bentley || — || 15,000 || 59–37
|- bgcolor="ffbbbb"
| 97 || August 2 || Giants || 2–3 || Watson || Meadows (9–6) || — || 18,000 || 59–38
|- bgcolor="ffbbbb"
| 98 || August 4 || Phillies || 2–4 || Ring || Adams (9–4) || — || — || 59–39
|- bgcolor="ccffcc"
| 99 || August 4 || Phillies || 4–3 || Morrison (16–7) || Weinert || — || — || 60–39
|- bgcolor="ffbbbb"
| 100 || August 6 || Phillies || 4–6 || Mitchell || Cooper (13–10) || — || — || 60–40
|- bgcolor="ffbbbb"
| 101 || August 7 || Phillies || 5–7 || Glazner || Meadows (9–7) || Behan || — || 60–41
|- bgcolor="ffbbbb"
| 102 || August 8 || Robins || 2–9 || Vance || Hamilton (5–6) || — || 5,000 || 60–42
|- bgcolor="ccffcc"
| 103 || August 8 || Robins || 5–2 || Morrison (17–7) || Grimes || — || 7,000 || 61–42
|- bgcolor="ccffcc"
| 104 || August 9 || Robins || 6–2 || Adams (10–4) || Dickerman || — || 4,000 || 62–42
|- bgcolor="ffbbbb"
| 105 || August 11 || Robins || 6–7 || Ruether || Cooper (13–11) || — || 12,000 || 62–43
|- bgcolor="ffbbbb"
| 106 || August 12 || @ Robins || 2–11 || Vance || Hamilton (5–7) || — || 22,000 || 62–44
|- bgcolor="ffbbbb"
| 107 || August 12 || @ Robins || 0–6 || Grimes || Morrison (17–8) || — || 22,000 || 62–45
|- bgcolor="ccffcc"
| 108 || August 13 || @ Robins || 5–2 || Meadows (10–7) || Smith || — || 4,000 || 63–45
|- bgcolor="ffbbbb"
| 109 || August 14 || @ Phillies || 10–16 || Couch || Stone (0–1) || Weinert || — || 63–46
|- bgcolor="ccffcc"
| 110 || August 15 || @ Phillies || 4–3 || Cooper (14–11) || Behan || — || — || 64–46
|- bgcolor="ffbbbb"
| 111 || August 16 || @ Phillies || 5–8 || Betts || Morrison (17–9) || — || — || 64–47
|- bgcolor="ccffcc"
| 112 || August 17 || @ Phillies || 11–6 || Hamilton (6–7) || Ring || — || — || 65–47
|- bgcolor="ccffcc"
| 113 || August 18 || @ Phillies || 9–8 (13) || Adams (11–4) || Ring || — || 10,000 || 66–47
|- bgcolor="ffbbbb"
| 114 || August 19 || @ Giants || 1–2 (12) || Scott || Cooper (14–12) || — || 25,000 || 66–48
|- bgcolor="ccffcc"
| 115 || August 20 || @ Giants || 3–1 || Morrison (18–9) || Nehf || — || 7,000 || 67–48
|- bgcolor="ccffcc"
| 116 || August 21 || @ Giants || 9–5 || Adams (12–4) || Watson || Hamilton (1) || 8,000 || 68–48
|- bgcolor="ccffcc"
| 117 || August 23 || @ Braves || 8–3 || Meadows (11–7) || Barnes || — || — || 69–48
|- bgcolor="ccffcc"
| 118 || August 24 || @ Braves || 7–2 || Cooper (15–12) || Oeschger || — || — || 70–48
|- bgcolor="ccffcc"
| 119 || August 25 || @ Braves || 5–2 || Morrison (19–9) || Marquard || — || — || 71–48
|- bgcolor="ccffcc"
| 120 || August 26 || @ Robins || 9–2 || Adams (13–4) || Ruether || — || 10,000 || 72–48
|- bgcolor="ffbbbb"
| 121 || August 29 || Cubs || 2–6 || Kaufmann || Cooper (15–13) || — || 5,000 || 72–49
|- bgcolor="ffbbbb"
| 122 || August 30 || Cardinals || 4–6 || Haines || Morrison (19–10) || — || 5,000 || 72–50
|- bgcolor="ffbbbb"
| 123 || August 31 || Cardinals || 2–3 || Doak || Cooper (15–14) || — || 4,500 || 72–51
|-

|- bgcolor="ffbbbb"
| 124 || September 1 || Cardinals || 2–8 || Sherdel || Adams (13–5) || — || 10,000 || 72–52
|- bgcolor="ccffcc"
| 125 || September 2 || @ Cubs || 8–6 (11) || Meadows (12–7) || Kaufmann || — || — || 73–52
|- bgcolor="ccffcc"
| 126 || September 3 || Reds || 7–2 || Morrison (20–10) || Benton || — || — || 74–52
|- bgcolor="ffbbbb"
| 127 || September 4 || Reds || 1–2 || Rixey || Cooper (15–15) || — || 7,000 || 74–53
|- bgcolor="ccffcc"
| 128 || September 5 || Reds || 6–2 || Meadows (13–7) || Luque || — || 5,000 || 75–53
|- bgcolor="ccffcc"
| 129 || September 6 || Cubs || 5–1 (5) || Hamilton (7–7) || Alexander || — || — || 76–53
|- bgcolor="ffbbbb"
| 130 || September 7 || Cubs || 4–6 || Keen || Adams (13–6) || — || — || 76–54
|- bgcolor="ccffcc"
| 131 || September 8 || Cubs || 4–0 || Morrison (21–10) || Aldridge || — || — || 77–54
|- bgcolor="ffbbbb"
| 132 || September 9 || @ Reds || 3–8 || Luque || Cooper (15–16) || — || 10,000 || 77–55
|- bgcolor="ccffcc"
| 133 || September 10 || @ Reds || 8–0 || Meadows (14–7) || Donohue || — || — || 78–55
|- bgcolor="ccffcc"
| 134 || September 11 || @ Reds || 4–3 || Morrison (22–10) || Benton || — || — || 79–55
|- bgcolor="ffbbbb"
| 135 || September 13 || Robins || 4–7 || Vance || Hamilton (7–8) || — || 5,000 || 79–56
|- bgcolor="ccffcc"
| 136 || September 13 || Robins || 6–3 || Cooper (16–16) || Henry || — || 12,000 || 80–56
|- bgcolor="ccffcc"
| 137 || September 15 || Robins || 4–1 || Meadows (15–7) || Ruether || — || 6,000 || 81–56
|- bgcolor="ffbbbb"
| 138 || September 15 || Robins || 2–13 || Grimes || Morrison (22–11) || — || 12,000 || 81–57
|- bgcolor="ffbbbb"
| 139 || September 17 || Braves || 1–6 || Marquard || Cooper (16–17) || — || — || 81–58
|- bgcolor="ccffcc"
| 140 || September 18 || Braves || 12–2 || Morrison (23–11) || Barnes || — || — || 82–58
|- bgcolor="ffbbbb"
| 141 || September 19 || Braves || 4–5 || Genewich || Adams (13–7) || — || — || 82–59
|- bgcolor="ffbbbb"
| 142 || September 21 || Giants || 4–8 || Scott || Meadows (15–8) || Nehf || 10,000 || 82–60
|- bgcolor="ffbbbb"
| 143 || September 21 || Giants || 1–8 || Watson || Cooper (16–18) || — || 20,000 || 82–61
|- bgcolor="ffbbbb"
| 144 || September 22 || Giants || 3–4 || Bentley || Morrison (23–12) || — || — || 82–62
|- bgcolor="ffbbbb"
| 145 || September 24 || Phillies || 2–4 || Couch || Meadows (15–9) || Behan || — || 82–63
|- bgcolor="ccffcc"
| 146 || September 24 || Phillies || 4–3 (10) || Cooper (17–18) || Betts || — || — || 83–63
|- bgcolor="ccffcc"
| 147 || September 25 || Phillies || 18–5 || Steineder (2–0) || Glazner || — || — || 84–63
|- bgcolor="ccffcc"
| 148 || September 26 || Phillies || 6–0 || Morrison (24–12) || Behan || — || — || 85–63
|- bgcolor="ffbbbb"
| 149 || September 27 || @ Cubs || 2–8 || Keen || Hamilton (7–9) || — || — || 85–64
|- bgcolor="ffbbbb"
| 150 || September 28 || @ Cubs || 1–2 || Aldridge || Cooper (17–19) || — || — || 85–65
|- bgcolor="ffbbbb"
| 151 || September 29 || @ Cubs || 4–5 (10) || Alexander || Meadows (15–10) || — || — || 85–66
|- bgcolor="ffbbbb"
| 152 || September 30 || @ Cubs || 4–5 || Wheeler || Morrison (24–13) || — || 20,000 || 85–67
|-

|- bgcolor="ccffcc"
| 153 || October 6 || @ Reds || 7–1 || Meadows (16–10) || Rixey || — || — || 86–67
|- bgcolor="ccffcc"
| 154 || October 7 || @ Reds || 7–5 || Morrison (25–13) || Donohue || — || — || 87–67
|-

|-
| Legend:       = Win       = LossBold = Pirates team member

Opening Day lineup

Notable transactions 
 May 22, 1923: Cotton Tierney, Whitey Glazner and $50,000 were traded by the Pirates to the Philadelphia Phillies for Lee Meadows and Johnny Rawlings.

Roster

Player stats

Batting

Starters by position 
Note: Pos = Position; G = Games played; AB = At bats; H = Hits; Avg. = Batting average; HR = Home runs; RBI = Runs batted in

Other batters 
Note: G = Games played; AB = At bats; H = Hits; Avg. = Batting average; HR = Home runs; RBI = Runs batted in

Pitching

Starting pitchers 
Note: G = Games pitched; IP = Innings pitched; W = Wins; L = Losses; ERA = Earned run average; SO = Strikeouts

Other pitchers 
Note: G = Games pitched; IP = Innings pitched; W = Wins; L = Losses; ERA = Earned run average; SO = Strikeouts

Relief pitchers 
Note: G = Games pitched; W = Wins; L = Losses; SV = Saves; ERA = Earned run average; SO = Strikeouts

Notes

References 
 1923 Pittsburgh Pirates team page at Baseball Reference
 1923 Pittsburgh Pirates Page at Baseball Almanac

Pittsburgh Pirates seasons
Pittsburgh Pirates season
Pittsburg Pir